Sports Information Services (SIS) is a company which provides content and production services to the betting industry; such as horse racing and greyhound racing, to betting shops in the United Kingdom and Ireland and other worldwide destinations. Previously, they provided news gathering services and specialised broadcast solutions to clients beyond betting industry.

It was formed in 1986 as Satellite Information Service, when bookmakers took the opportunity to broadcast live racing in their shops for the first time – previously only live audio commentary was broadcast to licensed betting offices (LBOs) and a 'whiteboard' man transcribed the shows and results in the LBOs. The service was launched initially in Bristol on 5 May 1987 and subsequently rolled out to approximately 10,400 bookmakers in the UK and Ireland.

SIS is owned by Ladbrokes 23%, Caledonia Investments 22.5%, Alternateport Limited 20.5%, William Hill Organisation 19.5%, Fred Done (co-owner of Betfred bookmakers) 7.5% and The Tote 6%. Minor shareholdings are also held by Leicester Racecourse Holdings Limited, The Bibury Club Limited (Salisbury), Stratford-on-Avon Racecourse Co. Ltd., Thirsk Racecourse Ltd., Catterick Racecourse Company Ltd. and Frontrelay Ltd.

Shareholder bookmakers account for approximately 5,800 LBOs receiving the SIS service.  Each of the bookmaker shareholders have board members representing them on the SIS (Holdings) board in the form of Nick Rust (Ladbrokes), Fred Done (Betfred), David Steele (William Hill) and Joe Scanlon (Tote).

In 2008 Amalgamated Racing Limited (trading as TurfTV) entered the marketplace and was SIS's only competitor for the distribution of horse racing and virtual racing products to LBOs in the UK and Ireland. TurfTV does not distribute to any of the worldwide locations serviced by SIS.

On 1 September 2016, seven independent racecourses (Fakenham, Ffos Las, Hexham, Newton Abbot, Plumpton, Ripon and Towcester) led by ARC (Arena Racing Company) started an alternative service known as The Racing Partnership ("TRP"). Racing from the six Arena courses including Doncaster, Southwell, Lingfield Park and Wolverhampton became available on TRP from 1 January 2017 with all other ARC and independent racecourses being added to the schedule over the following year. TRP's media technology and production and head of production are both ex-SIS employees.

In 2015 the SNG and connectivity part of the business was spun off as SIS Live Limited. On 9 October 2018, it was announced that NEP Group was to take over SIS Live, rebranding the firm to NEP Connect after a transition period.

History

1986 
SIS was formed in response to the impending change in the law.  Betting shops were able to have televisions displaying live racing action, replacing the previous Extel service of commentary over a loudspeaker.

1987 
Service launched on 5 May, supplying race coverage from two horse race and one greyhound meeting per day. Received by just 100 shops in Bristol with a target of 3,000 shops in its first year.

2002 
Successfully renegotiated contracts with the UK and Irish bookmakers for a further five years. Appointed by the betting industry to manage its rights licence with 49 of the UK racecourses and to include those races within its services.

2003 
The service supplied more than 1,200 UK horse race meetings per year, 1,500 greyhound meetings, 300 Irish and 300 South African horse race meetings and, as a response to the introduction of the National Lottery, a range of numbers betting products, including virtual horse and greyhound racing.

2008 

On 1 April 2008, BBC Resources sold its outside broadcasting division (BBC Outside Broadcasts) to SIS, and on 9 September launched the new combined company, SIS Live.

Now received in virtually all UK and Ireland shops, together with 300 outlets in Western Europe - a total of 9,500 shops. It was also broadcast to betting outlets in the Caribbean, Sri Lanka, Italy and the former USSR.

2011 
SIS became a partner with Peel Media for the operation of the studios and associated post-production facilities at MediaCityUK - operating under the name of Media City Studios Ltd (MCSL), rebranded in 2012 as Dock10.

2012 
A number of functions and departments moved to the MediaCityUK complex in Salford, Greater Manchester. Opened one of the largest teleports in the UK. Broadcast 80 hours of television for the betting shop industry every day from its facilities in MediaCityUK and also duplicated from its Milton Keynes base, together with the various satellite downlinks and uplinks for broadcasters around the world including European Tour Golf, Asian Tour Golf, BBC, ITV, ITN, Channel 4, Intelsat, British Sky Broadcasting – Sky News, Sky Sports, Sky Arabia & RRSat in Israel.

2013 
November 2013 SIS announced the signing of a seven-year contract with ITV regional news and ITN, to provide HD capable SNG trucks using Ka band satellite capacity.

2014 
In March 2014 SIS Live closed the outside broadcast department it had acquired in 2008 and withdrew from the market.

2015 

After many years operating as just a trading name, the SNG and connectivity segment of the business became a separate legal entity, SIS Live Ltd. Sharing the same CEO as SIS Ltd, the newly formed SIS Live Ltd became responsible for its own commercial decisions.

2017 
In January 2017 SIS announced a change of name, choosing to keep the SIS acronym but changing the first S's meaning from Satellite to Sports. The official line was "Satellite Information Services does not accurately reflect where we are today, and where we want to be".

2018 
Having already become a separate legal entity, SIS Live Limited was taken over by NEP Group, which rebranded the firm as NEP Connect after a two-month transition period. NEP Connect continues to be a supplier to SIS.

References

External links
Official website

Horse racing mass media in the United Kingdom
Greyhound racing in the United Kingdom
Companies based in Milton Keynes
Television production companies of the United Kingdom
1986 establishments in the United Kingdom
Mass media companies established in 1986
British companies established in 1986
2018 mergers and acquisitions